Pegarah is a rural locality in the local government area of King Island on King Island in Bass Strait, north of Tasmania. The 2016 census determined a population of 134 for the state suburb of Pegarah.

History
The name was used for a parish from about 1895, and the locality was gazetted in 1971. Pegarah is an Aboriginal word for “ripe”.

Geography
Bass Strait forms the eastern boundary, except for the enclosed locality of Naracoopa.

Road infrastructure
The C202 route enters from the north-west as Fraser Road and runs to the east before turning south where it passes through Naracoopa and continues south as Millwood Road before exiting. Route B25 (Grassy Road) enters from the west and runs east to the village of Pegarah, where it turns south-east and south until it exits. Route C203 (Pegarah Road) starts at an intersection with B25 in the village and runs east to Naracoopa.

References

King Island (Tasmania)
Towns in Tasmania